Sabina Yasmin (born 4 September 1953) is a Bangladeshi singer. She is best known as a playback singer in Bengali cinema. She has won Bangladesh National Film Award for Best Female Playback Singer a record 14 times. She has recorded more than 1,500 songs for films and over 10,000 songs in total.

Yasmin was awarded Ekushey Padak in 1984 and Independence Day Award in 1996 by the Government of Bangladesh.

Early life
Yasmin was born on 4 September 1953. Her father, Lutfar Rahman, worked in Provincial Civil Service of British Raj and her mother, Begum Mouluda Khatun, was a vocal artist who took lessons from the musician Ustaad Kader Baksh. Yasmin's sisters are singers Farida, Fauzia, Nazma and Nilufar. The first song that Yasmin learned with the household harmonium was Khokon Moni Shona. In 1964, she sang regularly in Khela Ghar, a radio programme. P.C. Gomez was her classical music mentor. Musician Altaf Mahmud discovered her singing voice while visiting her neighbour's house. She made her debut in playback singing through the song Modhu Jochnar Dipali for the film Agun Niye Khela (1967), directed by Zahir Raihan. As child artistes, she and Shahnaz Rahmatullah won awards from President Ayub Khan.

Career
Yasmin got her first breakthrough through the song titled Shudhu Gaan Geye Porichoy. She then started working under Altaf Mahmud in films including Anowara', 'Nayantara' and 'Taka Ana Pai'''. She gradually performed along with Satya Saha, Subal Das, Khan Ataur Rahman, Ali Hossain, Alauddin Ali, Ahmed Imtiaz Bulbul and Gazi Mazharul Anwar.

1960s
Yasmin has sung for films, radio, television and gramophone companies. She has been active in the Bangladeshi music industry since the 1970s.

1970s
When Yasmin entered the film industry, her co-eval Shahnaz Rahmatullah was the number one singer. In 1970, the film Jibon Theke Neya was released. It contained the song "Eki Sonar Aloy" which elevated Yasmin as the leading singer. She sang some patriotic songs "Sob Kota Janala","Swajan Harano Diner Samarane","Sei Railliner Dhare","Swadhinata Tumi" etc.

She garnered fame with the song "Sudhu Gaan Geye Porichoy" in 1972 film 'Abujh Mon'. She sang "Tumi Je Amar Kobita","Tumi Achho" etc. duets with Mahmudunnabi. She received the first Bangladesh National Film Award for Best Female Playback Singer in 1975 for her songs in Sujon Sokhi. She received three consecutive National film awards: in 1978 for Golapi Ekhon Train E; in 1979 for Sundari; and in 1980 for Kosai.

1980s
Veterans such as Ferdausi Rahman, Shahnaz Rahmatullah left playback singing. She sang numerous timeless hits for Yasmin including "Koto Sadhonay Emon Bhagyo Mele", "Shoto Jonomer Sadh", "E Jibone Tumi Ogo Ele" and many more. Her rising popularity dragged her to Indian cinema. In 1985, she sang "Cherona Cherona Ghaat" and "Jalpari" with Kishore Kumar in the Indo-Bangladesh joint production Anyay Abichar which had music by R. D. Burman.

1990s
Yasmin earned National Awards in 1991 for Danga and 1992 for Radha Krishna. In 1994, Kanak Chapa came to the music scene with the film Tomakei Chai.

2000s
By the year 2000, Kanak Chapa was already most sought after playback singer. Yet Yasmin got to sing numerous hit songs composed by top-notch music directors. She achieved National Film Award for her rendition of Tagore song "Boroshar Prothom Dine" in Dui Duari (2000). In 2004, her song "Preme Poreche Mon" in 'wrong number' topped the music top charts. She achieved her 12th and last National Film Award for 'Dui Noyoner Alo'.

2010s
Yasmin sang a duet with the winner of Channel-I Sera Kontho, Imran. In these years she sang for new generation of actresses like Apu Biswas, Sahara, Racy and others. Her song "Premiker Buk Jeno Sukher Nodi" featured in top charts for many weeks.

Personal life
Yasmin has married three times. She has a daughter, Fairooz Yasmin (Badhon), a singer, from her first marriage with Anisur Rahman, and a son, Srabon, from her second marriage with Amir Hossain. In 1998, she met Kabir Sumon, an Indian-Bengali musician and political activist, and later the couple got married.

In July 2007, Yasmin was diagnosed with Non-Hodgkin lymphoma. She was admitted to Labaid Hospital on 12 June. Doctors found that she was suffering from an infection of spleen. An emergency operation took place on 21 June. But her health didn't improve. So, she flew to Singapore for better treatment on 11 July. After having treatment for three and half months, she returned to Bangladesh.

Works

Popular songs

Filmography

Awards
Bangladesh National Film Award for Best Female Playback Singer
 1975 – Sujon Sokhi 1978 – Golapi Ekhon Traine 1979 – Sundari 1980 – Kosai 1984 – Chandranath 1985 – Premik 1987 – Rajlakshmi Srikanto 1988 – Dui Jibon 1991 – Danga 1992 – Radha Krishna 2000 – Aaj Gaye Holud 2005 – Dui Noyoner Alo 2012 – Devdas 2018 – Putro''
Others
 1984 – Ekushey Padak
 1996 – Independence Day Award
 2016 – Firoza Begum Gold Medal

References

External links

1953 births
Living people
University of Dhaka alumni
Bangladeshi playback singers
20th-century Bangladeshi women singers
20th-century Bangladeshi singers
Best Female Playback Singer National Film Award (Bangladesh) winners
Recipients of the Independence Day Award
Recipients of the Ekushey Padak
Honorary Fellows of Bangla Academy
Best Female Singer Bachsas Award winners
21st-century Bangladeshi women singers
21st-century Bangladeshi singers